Keren Goor (or Karen, ; born 28 July 1998) is an American-born Israeli footballer who plays as a midfielder for college team Santa Clara Broncos and the Israel women's national team.

Early life
Goor was born in Hollywood, Florida and raised in Ra'anana, Israel.

Career
Goor has been capped for the Israel national team, appearing for the team during the 2019 FIFA Women's World Cup qualifying cycle.

Honours 
Santa Clara Broncos
 NCAA Division I Women's Soccer Championship: 2020

References

External links

 
 

1998 births
Living people
Israeli women's footballers
Women's association football midfielders
Israel women's international footballers
Jewish Israeli sportspeople
Sportspeople from Hollywood, Florida
Soccer players from Florida
American women's soccer players
Santa Clara Broncos women's soccer players
Jewish American sportspeople
Footballers from Ra'anana
21st-century American Jews
21st-century American women